Marling is an unincorporated community in Montgomery County, in the U.S. state of Missouri.

History
A post office called Marling was established in 1894, and remained in operation until 1954. The community is named after Samuel Marling, the original owner of the town site.

References

Unincorporated communities in Montgomery County, Missouri
Unincorporated communities in Missouri